Qarah Su Rural District is in the Central District of Maku County, West Azerbaijan province, Iran. There were 6,955 inhabitants in 1,411 households at the National Census of 2011. At the most recent census of 2016, the population of the rural district was 6,012 in 1,372 households. The largest of its 24 villages was Dim Qeshlaq-e Olya, with 1,015 people.

References 

Maku County

Rural Districts of West Azerbaijan Province

Populated places in West Azerbaijan Province

Populated places in Maku County

fa:دهستان قره‌سو (ماکو)